Gassiev is a surname. Notable people with the surname include: 

Murat Gassiev (born 1993), Russian boxer
Pyotr Gassiev (born 1972), South Ossetian politician
Znaur Gassiev (1925–2016), South Ossetian politician